The Rocsen Museum is a museum located in Nono, Córdoba Province, Argentina, 8 km from Mina Clavero. It was established in 1969 and features a "multifaceted" collection of over 18,000 pieces, with natural history, archaeological and decorative objects from all around the world.

References

External links

 Museo Rocsen

Rocsen
Museums established in 1969
1969 establishments in Argentina